The 1890 Washington football team was an American football team that represented the University of Washington during the 1890 college football season. The 1890 Washington team was the first team to represent the University of Washington. The team had only one game, playing Washington College to a shutout loss on November 27, 1890, at Seattle. For the second consecutive year, Frank Griffiths was the team captain.

Schedule

References

Washington
Washington Huskies football seasons
College football winless seasons
Washington football